Atomica or Atomika may refer to:

Atomica, Atom comic book female superhero Rhonda Piñeda
Atomica (film), 2017 American science-fiction thriller film directed by Dagen Merrill and starring Dominic Monaghan
 Atomika, comic book series by Andrew Dabb
 Atomika, fictional DJ in video game Burnout Paradise